Albertus Antonius Smijers (19 July 188815 May 1957), was a Dutch musicologist who served as Professor of Musicology at the University of Utrecht. He was a noted authority on Josquin des Prez—44 volumes of Werken van Josquin des Prez were published in his lifetime, and another 11 after his death.

Early life
Smijers was born in Raamsdonksveer to a primary school head teacher and his wife. The oldest son in a "very religious" Catholic family, he had three brothers and two sisters. He studied church music in Klosterneuburg and was ordained as a Catholic priest on 1 June 1912. He later studied medieval music at the University of Music and Performing Arts Vienna and was supervised by Guido Adler at the University of Vienna, where he wrote a dissertation on Carolus Luython titled Karl Luython als Motettenkomponist. He graduated in 1917 and became one of the first Dutch musicologists to receive a doctorate.

Career
In 1921, he published the first volume of Werken van Josquin des Prez, which was closely modelled on Ottaviano Petrucci's publications and would eventually comprise 55 volumes. Until 1929, Smijers taught at a Catholic seminary in Amsterdam. In 1930, he was appointed Professor of Musicology at the University of Utrecht. He worked on the Werken until his death, producing 44 volumes on his own, and it was completed in 1969 by two of his students— and Willem Elders. Among his other students were Jacques Chailley; ; ; and Marius Flothuis. Apart from Josquin, Smijers also wrote on Jacob Obrecht, and Johannes Ockeghem, as well as the general history of music in the Netherlands.

Smijers held positions in numerous musical and musicological institutions. He was president of the Koninklijke Vereniging voor Nederlandse Muziekgeschiedenis (Royal Society for Music History of The Netherlands) from 1934 till his death, succeeding his mentor . From 1952 till 1955, Smijers served as president of the International Musicological Society, having been a member of its directorate since its inception in 1927.

Death
Having been ill since the start of the year, Smijer died on 15 May 1957, in Huis ter Heide. Hungarian-American musicologist Paul Henry Lang hailed Smijers as "that tower of international musical scholarship", whereas Dutch musicologist Petra van Langen claimed that "under the leadership of Albert Smijers, Dutch musicology achieved a prominent position in the world, especially in Renaissance music."

References

Citations

Works cited

 
 
 
 
 
 
 
 
 
 
 
 
 

1888 births
1958 deaths
Dutch musicologists
University of Vienna alumni
Academic staff of Utrecht University
20th-century Dutch non-fiction writers
20th-century musicologists
20th-century Dutch Roman Catholic priests
International Musicological Society presidents
Josquin scholars